In November 2014, Dutch Minister of Defence, Jeanine Hennis-Plasschaert, announced plans to replace the s with four new submarines in 2025. In later years this has been pushed back to at least 2034.

History 
Plans were announced by the Minister of Defence in November 2014 to replace the s with four new submarines in 2025. By 2017, there was still no political agreement on the quantity or type of new submarines to be ordered; nor the tasks they were expected to perform. However, it seems certain that they will be replaced, since the alleged Russian threat was regarded an incentive to invest in a new class. The Minister of Defence, however, delayed the replacement by two years, until 2027. Roughly, there are two groups in the Dutch parliament – one in favor of replacing the Walrus class by an equally capable class of large, expeditionary, diesel-electric submarine, and the other in favor of choosing a cheaper solution of smaller diesel-electrics, similar to Swedish and German submarines. It is unknown where the new boats will be built; since the Dutch RDM shipyard (the only Dutch yard capable of building submarines) is no longer in operation. The Defensienota (Defense policy for the coming years) of March 2018 revealed that the Dutch government is still planning to replace the Walrus-class submarines, with an allocated budget of more than 2.5 billion euros for the new submarines. Additional information on how to proceed with the replacement was expected at the end of 2018, when the Dutch Minister of Defence, Ank Bijleveld, was to send a so-called B-letter to the Dutch parliament. Minister Bijleveld also underlined in an interview that the new submarines should have the same niche capabilities as the current Walrus-class submarines: the ability to operate and gather intelligence in both shallow water close to the coast and in deep water in the ocean. In mid-2021 it was indicated that the revised plan was to take a decision on the replacement type in 2022 and to have the first vessel in service by 2028, with the first two boats to be in service by 2031. However, by October 2021 it was reported that this timeline was no longer feasible. Instead, the Dutch Ministry of Defence signalled that the envisaged dates would have to be "substantially adjusted", likely impacting the originally proposed in-service dates for the first submarines. In April 2022 it was announced that the revised schedule for construction of the new replacement boats would likely see the first two vessels entering service in the 2034 to 2037 timeframe.

On 16 November 2022 the next phase in the program was started when DMO delivered the request for quotation to the three remaining yards. It is expected that the proposals will come in during the summer of 2023 with a final decision being made by the navy in late 2023 or early 2024.

Contenders 
The Ministry of Defence has shortlisted three bidders:

 Damen Group and Saab Group announced that they have partnered from 2015 to jointly develop, offer and build next-generation submarines that are able to replace the current Walrus-class submarines. It was announced on 1 June 2018 that their design will be derived from the A26 submarine. The boat's armament includes 6 torpedo tubes and 1 multi-mission lock which can be used to deploy special forces.

 Naval Group announced that it is offering its newest submarine class, the Barracuda class, as replacement for the Walrus class. A version of the "Shortfin" diesel-electric variant Barracuda class was be offered, rather than the nuclear variant used by the French Navy.

 ThyssenKrupp Marine Systems is planning to offer a Type 212CD submarine.

Failed bids 
Spain's Navantia's S-80 was not accepted as a contender following the B-letter in 2019. In 2022 the Spanish Ministry of Defence send a letter to the Dutch DMO for Navantia to be allowed to put in an offer following a RfQ sent to the remaining contenders, in which some of the requirements have changed. It is rumoured that the request was denied by DMO.

See also 
 Royal Netherlands Navy Submarine Service

Citations

Royal Netherlands Navy

Military acquisition
Military planning
Proposed ships of the Royal Netherlands Navy
Naval weapons
Submarine classes